Mexican-Peruvian relations are the historical and current bilateral relationship between the United Mexican States and the Republic of Peru. Both nations are members of the Asia-Pacific Economic Cooperation, Community of Latin American and Caribbean States, Lima Group, Organization of Ibero-American States, Organization of American States, Pacific Alliance and the United Nations.

History 
Historically, both nations were host to great indigenous cultures; the Aztecs and Mayas in Mexico and the Incas in Peru. During colonization, both nations were part of the Spanish Empire until the early 19th century. Mexico was part of Viceroyalty of New Spain while Peru was part of the Viceroyalty of Peru. Diplomatic relations between Mexico and Peru were established in 1823, two years after Peru gained its independence from Spain. In October 1892, Mexico opened its first consulate in Lima followed by the opening of an embassy on 14 June 1937.

In 1932, a Peruvian newspaper published a letter by Peruvian politician Víctor Raúl Haya de la Torre where he talks about wanting to establish different styles of governing in Latin-America. The letter was addressed to a  colleague and states the plan in detail to another friend who he sent a letter (but never arrived) via a Mexican diplomatic pouch to Lima. This letter caused such an outrage in Peru that the government accused the Mexican government of 'meddling' in its internal affairs and severed diplomatic relations with Mexico. Diplomatic relations were once again restored in 1933 with the incoming of a new president in Peru.

In 1960, President Adolfo López Mateos was the first highest ranking Mexican official to visit Peru, followed by President Luis Echeverría in 1974. It wasn't until the 1990s that Peruvian Presidents Alan Garcia and Alberto Fujimori paid official visits to Mexico. Since then, there have been a continuous flow of official visits by both nations to each other's countries respectively.

In 2012, both nations became founding founders of the Pacific Alliance (along with Colombia and Chile). In July 2016, Mexican President Enrique Peña Nieto attended the inauguration of President Pedro Pablo Kuczynski. In December 2018, Peruvian President Martín Vizcarra attended the inauguration of President Andrés Manuel López Obrador.

In December 2022, López Obrador revealed that Peruvian President Pedro Castillo intended to request political asylum following the backlash to Castillo's attempted self-coup. Castillo was arrested before reaching the Mexican Embassy in Lima. On December 20th, the family of former President Castillo was granted asylum and flown to Mexico. The Mexican ambassador in Lima was declared "persona non grata" and ordered to leave Peru. In February 2023, Peruvian President Dina Boluarte withdrew the ambassador of Peru in Mexico.

High-level visits

Presidential visits from Mexico to Peru

 President Adolfo López Mateos (1960)
 President Luis Echeverría (1974)
 President Carlos Salinas de Gortari (1989)
 President Vicente Fox (2001, 2003, 2004)
 President Felipe Calderón (2008, 2011)
 President Enrique Peña Nieto (2013, 2015, July and November 2016, 2018)

Presidential visits from Peru to Mexico

 President Alan García (1985, 1987)
 President Alberto Fujimori (1991, 1996)
 President Alejandro Toledo (2002)
 President Ollanta Humala (2011, June and December 2014)
 President Martín Vizcarra (July and December 2018)
 President Pedro Castillo (2021)

Bilateral agreements
Both nations have signed several bilateral agreements such as an Agreement for the Exchange of Diplomatic Pouches; Agreement for Cultural and Educational Cooperation; Agreement on Tourism Cooperation; Agreement on Air Transportation; Agreement of Cooperation in combating Drug Trafficking and Drug Dependency; Agreement on Technical and Scientific Cooperation; Extradition Treaty; Agreement on Legal Assistance in Criminal Matters; Agreement of Cooperation in the Proceedings of Criminal Judgments; Agreement for Protection, Conservation, Recovery and Return of Stolen Archaeological, Artistic, Historical and Cultural Goods; Agreement for Commercial Integration; Agreement on the Avoidance of Double Taxation and to Prevent Fiscal Evasion in relation to Taxes on Income and an Agreement of Strategic Association.

Transportation
There are direct flights between both nations with the following airlines: Aeroméxico and LATAM Perú.

Trade relations 
On 1 February 2012, a free trade agreement between the two nations came into effect. In 2018, two-way trade between both nations amounted to US$1.9 billion. Mexico's main exports to Peru include: flat screen TVs; tractors for semi-trailers; shampoos; corrugated bars; silver minerals; electronics and automobiles. Peru's main exports to Mexico include: natural gas; minerals from copper; tomato; calamari; boxes, crates and cages; lead minerals; chilies sweets or peppers; tables, planks and beams. Peru is Mexico's 26th biggest trading partner and Mexico is Peru's second-largest foreign direct investor (after Brazil) with more than US$14 billion invested in the country. Several Mexican multinational companies such as América Móvil, Grupo Bimbo, Grupo México, Grupo Salinas, Mexiquem and Sigma Alimentos (among others) operate in Peru. Peruvian multinational company Kola Real operates in Mexico. Peruvian companies have invested over US$31.1 million in Mexico.

Resident diplomatic missions 
 Mexico has an embassy in Lima.
 Peru has an embassy in Mexico City.

See also 
 Peruvian Mexicans
 List of ambassadors of Peru to Mexico

References 

 
Peru
Bilateral relations of Peru